George Hill (11 October 1886 – 20 March 1967) was an American racecar driver and mechanic.

Indy 500 results

Notes

1886 births
1967 deaths
AAA Championship Car drivers
American racing drivers
Indianapolis 500 drivers
Racing drivers from Massachusetts